Ignacio Agustín Sánchez Romo (born 11 February 1993), commonly known as Nacho, is a Spanish footballer who plays as a left winger for Real Unión.

Club career
Born in Las Palmas, Canary Islands, Nacho graduated from CD Numancia's youth setup in 2012 after a stint at UD Logroñés. He was subsequently released, and joined SD Almazán in Tercera División.

After scoring a career-best 17 goals in 2014–15 (which included a hat-trick in a 3–0 home win against CD Mirandés B on 9 November 2014), Nacho moved back to Numancia and was assigned to the reserves also in the fourth level. On 23 August 2015, after spending the entire pre-season with the first team, he made his professional debut, coming on as a second-half substitute for Natalio in a 6–3 Segunda División home win against CD Tenerife.

On 3 November 2015, Nacho signed a new two-year deal with the Nuevo Estadio Los Pajaritos-based club. He scored his first goal as a professional on 22 May of the following year, netting the first in a 2–3 away loss to CA Osasuna.

On 8 June 2016, Nacho agreed to a further contract extension until 2019, and he was definitely promoted to the main squad in the following campaign. On 24 October 2017, he was one of two players on target for his team as they defeated La Liga side Málaga CF 2–1 in the first leg of the fourth round of the Copa del Rey, in spite of trailing 0–1 in stoppage time.

On 23 September 2020, after being relegated, Nacho signed for Marbella FC in Segunda División B.
In the summer of 2021, he signed for Real Unión.

References

External links

1993 births
Living people
Footballers from Las Palmas
Spanish footballers
Association football wingers
Segunda División players
Primera Federación players
Segunda División B players
Tercera División players
CD Numancia players
CD Numancia B players
Marbella FC players
Real Unión footballers